Scanderbeg (RV 732) is an opera (dramma per musica) in three acts composed by Antonio Vivaldi to an Italian libretto by Antonio Salvi. It was first performed at the Teatro della Pergola in Florence on 22 June 1718 to mark the re-opening of the theatre to public performances. While the libretto has been preserved, only fragments of the original score remain.

Roles

Synopsis
The subject of the opera is Skanderbeg, the 15th-century Albanian hero.

Recordings
Two arias from the opera's second act, "S'a voi penso, o luci belle" (Ormondo) and "Con palme ed allori" (Scanderbeg), can be heard on Arie ritrovate sung by contralto Sonia Prina with the Accademia Bizantina, conducted by Ottavio Dantone (Naïve Records).

References
Notes

Sources
Colas, Damien and Di Profio, Alessandro (2009). D'une scène à l'autre, l'opéra italien en Europe: Les pérégrinations d'un genre. Mardaga.  
Holmes, William (1994). Opera Observed: Views of a Florentine Impresario in the Early Eighteenth Century. University of Chicago Press. 
Strohm, Reinhard (2008a). The Operas of Antonio Vivaldi. Florence: Olschki.

Further reading
Strohm, Reinhard (2008b). Essays on Handel and Italian Opera. Cambridge University Press.

External links

Operas by Antonio Vivaldi
Italian-language operas
Operas
Operas based on real people
Operas set in the 15th century
Operas set in Europe
Albania in fiction
Cultural depictions of Skanderbeg
Opera seria
1718 operas